Adriaan Roland Holst (Amsterdam, 23 May 1888 – Bergen, North Holland, 5 August 1976) was a Dutch writer, nicknamed the "Prince of Dutch Poets".  He was the second winner, in 1948, of the Constantijn Huygens Prize.  
He was nominated for the Nobel Prize in Literature.

Holst was the nephew of painter Richard Roland Holst and writer Henriette Roland Holst. His extensive oeuvre is characterized by its own solemn style and rich symbolism.

Family
The artist Richard Roland Holst was a brother of his father and his wife Henriette Roland Holst-van der Schalk, the poet, writer and socialist was his aunt. Adriaan Roland Holst was called 'Jany' by friends and family. Throughout their lives all three kept in close contact.<ref>This is evident from:
 A. Roland Holst: Briefwisseling met Richard en Henriette Roland Holst. De Arbeiderspers, Amsterdam 1990.
 A. Roland Holst: In den verleden tijd, herinneringen aan Lodewijk van Deyssel e.a.. Boelen, Amsterdam 1975.Here e.g. p. 22-24, 37-39 (where he refers to his aunt Henriette Roland Holst as "the poet), 40-44.
 H. Roland Holst - van der Schalk : Het vuur brandde voort. Levensherinneringen. Nijgh & Van Ditmar 1949, third and fourth print, improved based on the legacy of the author: De Arbeiderspers, Amsterdam 1979.Hierin p. 77, 115, 208.
 E. Etty: Liefde is heel het leven niet, Henriette Roland Holst 1869-1952. Balans, Amsterdam 1996.</ref>

Biography
Adriaan Roland Holst grew up in the Gooi region. He went to the high school 'Hilversum HBS' (the school is now named after him and called the A. Roland Holst College) and studied Celtic Arts in Oxford from 1908 to 1911. Already at the age of twenty, he managed to publish poems in the literary magazine "De XXste Eeuw". In 1911 his debut appeared in book form, the bundle "Verzen". In his next bundles "The confession of silence" ("De belijdenis van de stilte") and "Beyond the roads" ("Voorbij de wegen") his own voice has already reached maturity. The verses reveal a romantic desire, from mythology and lofty solitude. "Deirdre and the sons of Usnach" ("Deirdre en de zonen van Usnach", 1920), which appeared in the bibliophile series Palladium, is a poetic story in a Celtic world. It is still widely read.
In 1918, Roland Holst went to live in Bergen, where his house is now is inhabited by various writers and poets in rotation. He had many literary friends, such as Menno ter Braak, J. C. Bloem, E. du Perron, J. Slauerhoff, M. Vasalis and Victor E. van Vriesland.

Works

 1911 - Verzen 1913 - De belijdenis van de stilte 1920 - Deirdre en de zonen van Usnach 1920 - Voorbij de wegen 1925 - De afspraak 1925 - De wilde kim 1926 - Ex tenebris mundi: gedichten 1926 -  1928 - Het Elysisch verlangen (gevolgd door De zeetocht van Ban) 1928 - Shelley, een afscheid 1932 - Tusschen vuur en maan 1936 - De pooltocht der verbeelding 1936 - Voorteekens 1937 - Een winter aan zee 1938 - Uit zelfbehoud 1940 - In memoriam Charles Edgar du Perron en Menno ter Braak 1940 - Onderweg 1943 - Voor West-Europa 1945 - Een winterdageraad 1945 - Eigen achtergronden 1946 - In memoriam Herman Gorter 1946 - Sirenische kunst 1947 - De twee planeten 1947 - Tegen de wereld 1948 - In ballingschap 1948 - Van erts tot arend 1950 - Swordplay wordplay 1951 - De dood van Cuchulainn van Murhevna 1951 - Woest en moe 1957 - Bezielde dorpen 1958 - In gevaar 1960 - Omtrent de grens 1962 - Onder koude wolken 1966 - Aan prinses Beatrix 1967 - Kort 1967 - Uitersten 1968 - Vuur in sneeuw 1970 - Met losse teugel 1971 - Verzamelde gedichten 1975 - In den verleden tijd''

References

A. Roland Holst in the Biografisch Woordenboek van Nederland

1888 births
1976 deaths
Dutch male poets
Constantijn Huygens Prize winners
P. C. Hooft Award winners
People from Bergen, North Holland 
Prijs der Nederlandse Letteren winners
Writers from Amsterdam